The Men's Sabre event of the 2013 World Combat Games was held  in Saint Petersburg, Russia on 24 October.

Medalists

Athlete list

 Aliaksandr Buikevich
 Fernando Casares
 Tiberiu Dolniceanu
 Csanád Gémesi
 Gu Bon-gil
 Kim Jung-hwan
 Nikolay Kovalev
 Nicolas Limbach
 Joseph Polossifakis
 Veniamin Reshetnikov
 Luigi Samele
 Hichem Samandi
 Áron Szilágyi
 Benedikt Wagner

Results

References
Bracket

Fencing at the 2013 World Combat Games